Righteous Ties is a 2006 South Korean film.

Plot 
Chi-sung, a gangster, is sent to prison for seven years after stabbing a man on orders from his boss. But his boss betrays him and tries to have him killed, though the attempt is unsuccessful and Chi-sung manages to escape. His childhood friend Joo-joong is given the task of tracking him down, forcing him to choose between his friendship and loyalty to his gang.

Cast 
 Jung Jae-young ... Dong Chi-sung
 Jung Joon-ho ... Kim Ju-jung
 Ryu Seung-ryong ... Jung Sun-tan
 Min Ji-hwan ... Kim Young-hee
 Shin Goo ... Chi-sung's father 
 Lee Yong-yi ... Chi-sung's mother
 Kim Dong-ju
 Yoon Yoo-sun ... Hwa-yi
 Lee Moon-soo ... death row inmate
 Joo Jin-mo
 Jang Young-nam
 Jung Gyu-soo
 Kim Kyu-chul ... Han-wook
 Kim Il-woong
 Lee Han-wi
 Lee Jeong
 Park Jung-gi
 Yoon Yoo-seon
 Im Seung-dae
 Park Jun-se
 Lee Cheol-min ... Park Moon-soo
 Kim Sung-hoon
 Kong Ho-suk 
 Lee Sang-hoon ... Yoo Myung-sik
 Choi Won-tae ... young Ju-jung

Release 
Righteous Ties was released in South Korea on October 19, 2006, and topped the box office on its opening weekend with 450,134 admissions.

References

External links 
  
 
 
 

2006 films
2000s crime comedy films
Films about organized crime in South Korea
2000s Korean-language films
Films directed by Jang Jin
South Korean crime comedy films
2006 comedy films
2000s South Korean films